Beaumaris is a town and community on the Isle of Anglesey in Wales, of which it is the former county town of Anglesey. It is located at the eastern entrance to the Menai Strait, the tidal waterway separating Anglesey from the coast of North Wales. At the 2021 census, its population was 1,121. The community includes Llanfaes.

History

The castle was built on a marsh and that is where it found its name; the Norman-French builders called it , which translates as "fair marsh".

The ancient village of Llanfaes, a mile to the north of Beaumaris, had been occupied by Anglo-Saxons in 818 but had been regained by Merfyn Frych, King of Gwynedd, and remained a vital strategic settlement. To counter further Welsh uprisings, and to ensure control of the Menai Strait, Edward I chose the flat coastal plain as the place to build Beaumaris Castle. The castle was designed by the Savoyard mason Master James of Saint George and is considered the most perfect example of a concentric castle. The 'troublesome' residents of Llanfaes were removed en bloc to Rhosyr in the west of Anglesey, a new settlement King Edward entitled "Newborough".

Beaumaris was awarded a royal charter by Edward I, which was drawn up on similar terms to the charters of his other castle towns in North Wales and intended to invest only the English and Norman-French residents with civic rights. Native Welsh residents of Beaumaris were largely disqualified from holding any civic office, carrying any weapon, and holding assemblies; and were not allowed to buy houses or land within the borough. The charter also specifically prohibited Jews (who had been largely expelled from most English towns) from living in Beaumaris.

From 1562 until the Reform Act 1832, Beaumaris was a Rotten Borough with the member of parliament elected by the Corporation of the town which was in the control of the Bulkeley family.

Beaumaris was the port of registration for all vessels in North West Wales, covering every harbour on Anglesey and all the ports from Conwy to Pwllheli. Shipbuilding was a major industry in Beaumaris. This was centred on Gallows Point – a nearby spit of land extending into the Menai Strait about a mile west of the town. Gallows Point had originally been called "Osmund's Eyre" but was renamed when the town gallows was erected there – along with a "Dead House" for the corpses of criminals dispatched in public executions. Later, hangings were carried out at the town gaol and the bodies buried in a lime-pit within the curtilage of the gaol. One of the last prisoners to hang at Beaumaris issued a curse before he died – decreeing that if he was innocent the four faces of the church clock would never show the same time.

According to historian Hywel Teifi Edwards, when the "Provincial Eisteddfod" was held at Beaumaris in 1832, a young Princess Victoria and her mother were in attendance.

Beaumaris has never had a railway station built to the town, although the nearby village of Pentraeth had a station on the former Red Wharf Bay branch line which ran off the Anglesey Central Railway. It was roughly six miles west of the town by road. This station closed in 1930.

Architecture

Notable buildings in the town include the castle, a courthouse built in 1614, the 14th-century St Mary's and St Nicholas's Church, Beaumaris Gaol, the 14th-century Tudor Rose (one of the oldest original timber-framed buildings in Britain) and the Bulls Head Inn, built in 1472, which General Thomas Mytton made his headquarters during the "Siege of Beaumaris" during the second English Civil War in 1648.

A native of Anglesey, David Hughes, founded Beaumaris Grammar School in 1603. It became a non-selective school in 1952 when Anglesey County Council became the first authority in Britain to adopt comprehensive secondary education. The school was eventually moved to Menai Bridge and only the ancient hall of the original school building now remains. Beaumaris Town Hall was completed in 1785.

Beaumaris Pier, opened in 1846, was designed by Frederick Foster and is a masonry jetty on wooden and concrete pilings. The pier was rebuilt and extended to  after storm damage in 1872, and a large pavilion containing a cafe was built at the end. It was once the landing stage for steamships of the Liverpool and North Wales Shipping Company, including the Snowdon, La Marguerite, St. Elvies and St. Trillo, although the larger vessels in its fleet – the St. Seriol and St. Tudno – were too large for the pier and landed their passengers at Menai Bridge. In the 1960s, through lack of maintenance, the pier became unsafe and was threatened with demolition, but local yachtswoman and lifeboat secretary Miss Mary Burton made a large private donation to ensure the pier was saved for the town. A further reconstruction was carried out between 2010 and 2012.

The Saunders Roe company set up a factory at Fryars (the site of the old Franciscan friary to the east) when it was feared that the company's main base on the Isle of Wight would be a target for World War II Luftwaffe bombers. The factory converted American-built PBY Catalina flying boats. After the war, the company focused on their ship building produced at the site with fast patrol boats, minesweepers and an experimental Austin Float Plane. They also produced buses for London Transport (RT Double deckers) and single deck buses for Cuba.

Lifeboat
The first recorded rescue of people in difficulty at sea was in 1830 when 375 people were rescued from a foundered emigrant ship. A lifeboat station was established in 1891 and closed four years later when a neighbouring station was provided with a more powerful lifeboat. The station was reopened in 1914 and is operated by the RNLI.

Education
Beaumaris is served by one primary school. Its 300-year-old grammar school moved to nearby Menai Bridge in 1963 and became the comprehensive Ysgol David Hughes.

Demographics

Languages 
According to the United Kingdom Census 2021, 36.8 per cent of all usual residents aged 3+ in Beaumaris can speak Welsh. 56.3 per cent of the population noted that they could speak, read, write or understand Welsh.

The 2011 census noted 39.5 per cent of all usual residents aged 3 years and older in the town could speak Welsh. The 2011 census also noted that 58.7 per cent of all usual residents aged 3+ who were born in Wales could speak Welsh. In 2001, 39.7 per cent of all usual residents aged 3+ in Beaumaris could speak Welsh. In 1981, 39.9 per cent of the population could speak Welsh; 10 people were monoglot Welsh speakers.

Events
The Beaumaris Food Festival is an annual food festival that has been held since 2013 in the town and castle grounds.

Notable residents

Sir Richard Bulkeley (1533–1621), politician and courtier of Elizabeth I, ex officio mayor (1561–1562) and mayor (1562–1563).
 Catherine Davies (1773 – after 1841), governess to the children of the King and Queen of Naples and autobiographer.
 Hugh Davies (1739–1821) botanist and Anglican clergyman, became rector of Llandegfan with Beaumaris in 1778.
 Charles Allen Duval (1810–1872), portrait painter, photographer, illustrator and writer.
Wayne Hennessey (born 1987), Welsh international footballer, approaching 300 club caps and 106 for Wales.
 Hendrik Lek (1903–1985) painter and antique dealer, born in Antwerp, Belgium; lived in retirement in Anglesey. 
Richard Llwyd (1752–1835), author, poet and genealogist.
Reginald Wynn Owen (1876–1950) architect, worked for the London and North Western Railway.
Neil Sloane (born 1939), mathematician noted for compiling integer sequences.

Namesakes
Beaumaris, the suburb of Melbourne, Victoria, Australia, and the small seaside town of Beaumaris in Tasmania, were both named after the town.
Beaumaris, the neighbourhood in Edmonton, Alberta, Canada, was named after the castle, as was the village of Beaumaris in Muskoka, Ontario.

In popular culture
In 2018, Netflix used Beaumaris as the fictional seaside town (and in particular the pier) for the series Free Rein.

Beaumaris also featured in the 2021 series of Craig and Bruno's Great British Roadtrips. The series followed Strictly Come Dancing stars Craig Revel Horwood and Bruno Tonioli as they visit various North Wales destinations.

See also
Beaumaris town walls

References

External links

Beaumaris official website

Beaumaris
Former county towns in Wales
Towns in Anglesey